The Big Ten Conference Women's Basketball Player of the Year is a basketball award given to the Big Ten Conference's most outstanding player. The award was first given following the Big Ten's first full season of women's basketball in 1982–83 (although the conference held its first postseason tournament the previous season). The league's head coaches have presented the award since 1983; media members who cover Big Ten women's basketball began presenting their own version of the award in 1996.

Ten players have won the award multiple times. Seven players have won twice: Anucha Browne of Northwestern (1984, 1985), Tracey Hall of Ohio State (1986, 1987), Katie Douglas of Purdue (2000, 2001), Kelly Mazzante of Penn State (2003, 2004), Maggie Lucas of Penn State (2013, 2014), Megan Gustafson of Iowa (2018, 2019), and Caitlin Clark of Iowa (2022, 2023). Three players, all from Ohio State, have won more than two awards. Jantel Lavender is the only four-time winner (2008–2011), though only the 2009 and 2010 awards were unanimous (she won the coaches' award in 2008 and the media award in 2011). Jessica Davenport is the only player to have been the unanimous winner of three awards (2005–2007). The other three-time winner, Kelsey Mitchell, won the coaches' award in 2015 and 2018 and both awards in 2017.

Three players have won a major national player of the year award in the same season in which they won the Big Ten award. Carol Ann Shudlick of Minnesota won the Wade Trophy along with the Big Ten award in 1994; Stephanie White of Purdue won the same two awards in 1999; and Gustafson won the Big Ten award and Naismith Trophy in 2019.

The coaches and media have split their honors six times in all, with the most recent being 2018, when Mitchell won the coaches' award and Gustafson won the media award.

Ohio State has the record for the most awards with 15, and the most individuals who have won the award, with seven. Of current Big Ten Conference members, three schools have never had a winner: long-established member Indiana, and the two schools that joined the conference in 2014, Maryland and Rutgers.

Key

Winners

Winners by school

See also
 Chicago Tribune Silver Basketball, another award formerly presented to the Big Ten men's and women's players of the year

Footnotes

References
General
 
 Players of the Year through 2013–14 season: p. 77
 National award winners: p. 78
 Positions for winners prior to 2014–15, unless noted otherwise: Most Valuable Players (by school), pp. 74–75

Specific

Player of the Year
NCAA Division I women's basketball conference players of the year
Awards established in 1983